Erwann Corbel (born 20 April 1991) is a French cyclist, who currently rides for French amateur team ES Torigni.

Major results

2010
 1st Stage 1 Tour de New Caledonia
2012
 1st Stage 3 Kreiz Breizh Elites
 1st Stage 1 Tour des Deux-Sèvres
 1st Stage 4 Trophée Aven Moros
 2nd Grand Prix des Hauts-de-France
 10th Overall Tour de Gironde
2013
 1st Stage 2b Kreiz Breizh Elites
 7th Overall Tour de Picardie
 8th Circuito de Getxo
 9th Boucles de l'Aulne
 10th Val d'Ille Classic
2014
 4th Le Samyn
 10th Tro-Bro Léon
2015
 1st Road race, Brittany Regional Road Championships
 1st Bourg-Arbent-Bourg
 1st Boucles de l'Austreberthe
 1st Ronde Briochine
 2nd Circuit de l'Essor
 2nd Manche-Atlantique
 2nd Paris–Mantes-en-Yvelines
 3rd Flèche de Locminé
 3rd Tour du Canton de Saint-Ciers
 3rd Essor Breton
2017
 6th Grote Prijs Jef Scherens
 7th Grand Prix de la Somme

References

External links

1991 births
Living people
Cyclists from Rennes
French male cyclists